CACC may refer to:

 Calcium-activated chloride channel, a cellular ion signalling pathway
 Campaign against Climate Change, a UK pressure group that aims to raise public awareness of global warming through mobilising mass demonstrations
 A Canada (CA) Ministry of Health Communication Centre
 Center for Animal Care and Control, the non-profit operator of New York City's municipal shelter system
 Central Alabama Community College, a two-year institution of higher learning located in Alexander City, Alabama.
 Central Atlantic Collegiate Conference, a US intercollegiate athletic conference affiliated with the NCAA's Division II
 Citizens for Alternatives to Chemical Contamination, a Michigan environmental group
 Commercial Aircraft Corporation of China Ltd., a Chinese company manufacturing large passenger aircraft
 Commander, Air Component Command, a US military abbreviation (see 607th Air Intelligence Squadron)
 Correlated Active Clause Coverage, A Logic Coverage Criterion from Software Testing
 Cooperative Adaptive Cruise Control, an extension of Adaptive Cruise Control in which vehicles exchange information
 Chin Association for Christian Communication, a non-profit organization for Chin people in Burma. 

 Cliftonville Academy Cricket Club